"Chattanooga Choo Choo" is a 1941 song. The title may also refer to:

 Chattanooga Choo Choo (film), a 1984 comedy starring Barbara Eden and George Kennedy
 Chattanooga Choo-Choos, a minor league Negro league baseball team based in Chattanooga, Tennessee from 1940 to 1946
 Chattanooga Choo-Choo Hotel, formerly Terminal Station